State Route 186 (SR  186) is a state highway in the U.S. state of Tennessee. It runs from Trenton southward to Jackson, passing through the towns of Gibson and Three Way along the way. The southern portion serves as a western bypass for the city of Jackson, which is signed as U.S. Route 45 Bypass (US 45 Bypass).

U.S. Route 45 Bypass

U.S. Route 45 Bypass (US 45 Bypass), also known as Keith Short Bypass, is an approximately 10 mile expressway bypass for US 45 in Jackson, Tennessee. It has the unsigned designation of State Route 186 (SR 186) for its entire length.

Route description

US 45 Bypass begins at an intersection with US 45 (SR 5/Highland Avenue) and US 70 (SR 1/E Chester Street) in downtown. It goes north as a four-lane divided highway, concurrent with US 70/SR 1, to leave downtown and pass through industrial areas to have a signalized intersection with State Street. It then curves to the north and US 70/SR 1 immediately split off and go east along Airways Boulevard towards McKellar-Sipes Regional Airport. US 45 Bypass continues through suburban neighborhoods to pass through a business district before having an interchange with Hollywood Drive. It then has a signalized intersection with US 412 Bus (SR 20/North Parkway) before widening to a six-lane at-grade boulevard. It then passes through another business district before having a partial cloverleaf interchange with I-40/US 412 (Exits 80 A/B) and reducing to four lanes. Temporarily becoming a limited-access highway, US 45 Bypass immediately has an interchange with Vann Drive and Country Club Lane, where it widens back to six lanes. It passes Union University before having at-grade intersections with Union University Drive/Channing Way, Oil Well Road, Old Humboldt Road, and Ashport Road. US 45 Bypass then comes to an end at an interchange with US 45 (SR 5/N Highland Avenue) and Passmore Lane a short distance later, with unsigned SR 186 continuing north along US 45/SR 5.

Major intersections

Route description

Gibson County

SR 186 begins as a 2-lane secondary highway in Gibson County in Trenton at an intersection with US 45W slightly southeast of downtown and is known as Gibson Highway. It goes southeast through farmland to have an intersection with SR 420 to enter the town of Gibson, where it passes through downtown and has an intersection with US 79/US 70A/SR 76. (It is known as Main Street in Gibson). From here, SR 186 continues south (as just Highway 186) through farmland to have a short concurrency with SR 187 and have an intersection with SR 152 before crossing into Madison County.

Madison County

SR 186 runs south through farmland to enter Three Way, and has an intersection and becomes concurrent with US 45E/SR 43, where it becomes a four-lane divided highway, as well as an unsigned primary highway. They go southwest and almost immediately come to an interchange with US 45W/SR 5, where SR 43 ends and US 45E and US 45W merge to become US 45, which SR 5 and SR 186 follow south. They continue south as a six-lane divided highway for about  before coming to an interchange with Highland Street, where US 45/SR 5 branch off and SR 186 follows US 45 Bypass. US 45 Bypass/ SR 186 (also known as the Keith Short Bypass) continue south around the western side of the city of Jackson through suburban areas as a 4 to 6 lane expressway, where it has interchanges with Vann Drive, I-40/US 412 (Exit 80 A/B), an at-grade intersection with US 412 Bus/SR 20, and an interchange with Hollywood Drive. US 45 Bypass/SR 186 then come to an intersection and become concurrent with US 70/SR 1, where it makes a sudden sharp turn to the east to enter downtown, where it becomes an at-grade surface route before US 45 Bypass and SR 186 both come to an end at an intersection with US 45/SR 5.

The portion of SR 186 from Three Way to Downtown Jackson is unsigned.

Future
The city of Jackson along with TDOT is planning on re-routing SR 186 (along with US 45 Bypass) away from downtown. Under the current plans, it would extend the bypass south across the South Fork of the Forked Deer River and connect it with US 45 in South Jackson. It would route through traffic away from the central business district and give another crossing for South Jackson commuters.

Major intersections

See also

List of state routes in Tennessee

References

Tennessee Department of Transportation (24 January 2003). "State Highway and Interstate List 2003".
Southern Extension of the US 45 Bypass Study :: Jackson, Tennessee

External links
Tennessee Department of Transportation

186
Transportation in Gibson County, Tennessee
Transportation in Madison County, Tennessee
Freeways in Tennessee